Roadside America was an indoor miniature village and railway covering . Created by Laurence Gieringer in 1935, it was first displayed to the public in his Hamburg, Pennsylvania, home. The miniature village's popularity increased after stories were published about it in local newspapers, which prompted Gieringer to move it to a recently-closed local amusement park called Carsonia Park. This location, which supported more visitors, was open from 1938 to about 1940.

After being closed since March 2020 due to the COVID-19 pandemic, Roadside America announced on November 21, 2020, that they were closing permanently after trying, unsuccessfully, to find a buyer for the past three years, and that they would be auctioning off the display.

The display

The 3/8 inch to one foot scale display contains:
 A 7,450 square foot, fully landscaped village diorama displaying over 300 miniature structures
 Up to 18 O gauge trains, trolleys and cable cars running throughout the display
 10,000 hand-made trees
 4,000 miniature people engaged in everyday daily pursuits
 Many rivers, streams and waterways
 Interactive animations such as a circus parade, construction workers, saw mill workers and more that can be activated by visitors
 600 miniature light bulbs

The display is constructed with:

 21,500 feet of electrical wiring
 17,700 board feet of lumber
 6,000 feet of building paper
 4,000 feet of sheet metal under the plaster work
 2,250 feet of railroad track
 648 feet of canvas for waterproofing
 450 feet of pipe
 18,000 pounds of plaster
 4,000 pounds of sheet iron
 900 pounds of nails
 600 pounds of rubber roofing material
 75 pounds of dry paint
 75 gallons of liquid paint
 225 bushels of moss
 25 bags of cement
 Three barrels of screened sawdust
 Three barrels of tar
Roadside America remained unchanged since Gieringer died in 1963.

References

 
 "Roadside America," The Washington Post, January 2, 2005
 "Tiny Town is a Big Attraction," The Baltimore Sun, January 1, 2004
 "The Absolutely Original Roadside America" by Richard “Zippy” Grigonis. November 3, 2010
 "Roadside America: A tiny slice of Americana" CBS Sunday Morning. June 3, 2018

Miniature parks
Museums in Berks County, Pennsylvania
Railroad museums in Pennsylvania
Roadside attractions in Pennsylvania
1935 establishments in Pennsylvania
2020 disestablishments in Pennsylvania